
Arai may refer to:

Places 
Arain, Armenia
 Arai, Niigata, Japan
 Arai, Shizuoka, Japan
 Arai, India

People
Arai (surname)

Companies
 Arai Helmet (アライ), a Japanese motorcycle helmet manufacturer
 ARAI (Automotive Research Association of India), an R&D, Certification & Regulatory body in India.

Organisations
Archives and Records Association, Ireland